B. americanus may refer to:

 Berthellina americanus, a snail species
 Bos americanus, a mammal species
 Bufo americanus, a toad species

See also
 Americanus (disambiguation)